Zita Cabello-Barrueto (born 1950) is a professor at San Francisco State University (SFSU) in San Francisco, California. She teaches classes on U.S. intervention in other countries, especially her native Chile.
A staunch opponent of torture, Zita has made two films on the subject.  She  strongly opposes George W. Bush's stance against John McCain's anti-torture bill; Bush objects to the bill because it does not exempt the CIA.  Her disdain for torture comes from her personal experience under Chile's CIA-initiated coup d'état and ensuing 17-year dictatorship of Augusto Pinochet Ugarte.  The regime jailed, tortured, and murdered her brother in the 1970s. Her husband Patricio Barrueto was also jailed.

References
 
 The Center for Justice and Accountability - Zita Cabello-Barrueto's profile

External links
 SFSU Official Site

1950 births
Living people
Chilean academics
San Francisco State University faculty